Les Cahiers du GRIF was a French language feminist periodical that examined women's views through kinship, politics, love, sexuality, knowledge, work, and creation. Founded in 1973 in Brussels by Françoise Collin, the last issue was published in 1994.

 Issues one to 24 (1973 to 1978) and issues 25 to 28 (1982 to 1983) were published by GRIF.
 Issues 29 to 48 (1984 to 1994) were published by Éditions Tierce. 

From 1980 to 1982 a total of seven Bulletins des Cahiers du GRIF have been distributed.

History 

While visiting New York City in 1972, Collin became exposed to American feminism.  She decided to start a feminist group in Belgium.

In 1973, Collins formed a feminist group in Brussels called Groupe de recherche et d'information féministes (GRIF). It brought together Jacqueline Aubenas, Eliane Boucquey, Marie-Thérèse Cuvelliez, Marie Denis, Hedwige Peemans-Poullet, Geneviève Simon, Marthe Van de Meulebroeke, Suzanne Van Rokeghem, and Jeanne Vercheval. 

Together, the women of GRIF created a new journal, Les Cahiers du GRIF,  "It was the fruit of various encounters, sleepless nights, dark days, races against the time, letters and texts, burnt or absent dinners, a little sun for some, no sun at all for others and most importantly, a lot of friendship."On November 11, 1973, the first issue (1,500 copies) was publish on the occasion of the second F day for women . This issue raised the question "what is feminism? And above all: feminism, for what?" Distributed simultaneously in Brussels and at the Librairie Maspero in Paris, the press run was sold out that same evening.

Les Cahiers du GRIF printed between 1000 and 6000 copies per issue, it rapidly became the most broadcast Belgian journal. Despite this success, the publication of Cahiers was discontinued at the end of 1978. The main reason of this stop was on the one hand the fatigue of the group and on the other hand the evolution of feminism.  In 1982 to 1984, GRIF published several more issues before stopping again.

In 1984, Les Cahiers du GRIF was revived by Éditions Tierce, which published 19 more issues until the journal was permanently discontinued in 1994.

Impact 
Les Cahiers du GRIF had a "mail" section open to reactions, criticism and ideas. The editorial staff encourage a broad collaboration  enrich the magazine. The staff organized public discussions  after the publication of each issue.

Les Cahiers du GRIF initially centered on the problems of the status of women, began to examine broader societal issues from the point of view of women or gender. The aim was to show the opinions of women in all areas. Les Cahiers du GRIF explained, argued and structured throughout the issues the neofeminist thought and analyzes. They explored themes of kinship, love, sexuality, knowledge, creation, body, work (household and professional), family, violence, social security, politics, social conflicts, religion, arts, language ...

Les Cahiers du GRIF did not claim a fixed editorial line, but instead tried to gather a wide variety of women's views.  The staff was  politically and ideologically pluralistic. The published articles did not necessarily imply universal agreement. During editorial meetings, full freedom of speech was encourage. "There were contradictions obviously. But you felt a will to move forward and move forward in the right direction ”. 

Les Cahiers du GRIFessential played a part in the women's movement of the 1970s, then of feminist research in the 1980s and 1990s. At first, they helped to identify the political structure - in the Arendtian sense - of feminism, making it possible to build - by women and for women - spaces of emancipation, collective strengths and public visibility. Secondly, they allowed the dissemination of research on women and feminist research.

The preparatory meetings for Les Cahiers du GRIF usually brought together around ten women from different philosophical and social backgrounds. They were occasionally joined by others, especially to contribute in themed issues. Open to foreign collaborations and less radical movements, original and of very high quality, the journal was de facto aimed at an intellectual audience; it was quickly known and renowned abroad, particularly in French-speaking countries.

The presence of Mineur, Harvengt and  Rigomont opened Les Cahiers du GRIF to labor questions. Vercheval tirelessly insisted that the social dimension of inequalities not be forgotten. She also insisted on the need of not getting lost in overly theoretical debates. "At GRIF, we never had any problems with caste, class, things were quite clear, a bourgeois was no more than a worker, quite the contrary." "People like Eliane Boucquey or Françoise Collin or Hedwige Peemans Poullet, they were intellectuals who were within our reach. They were listening. We never felt humiliated by their analyzes. They were women with whom we felt good. Me in any case." 

Boucquey suggested to Vercheval to dedicate an issue of Les Cahiers du GRIFto women workers. Together with Peemans-Poullet, they created the thematic issue "Les femmes font la fête, font la grève". 

There are several articles published in Les Cahiers du GRIF where Vercheval gives voice to women workers, highlighting their professional difficulties, inequalities in employment, relationships with men, militancy, crisis, unemployment, revolt, strikes. She also mentions abortion, always through the words of women she encountered during her activism.

References

Further reading 
 Martine Larroche et Michèle Larrouy, Mouvements de presse des années 1970 à nos jours, luttes féministes et lesbiennes, Paris, Éditions ARCL Archives Recherches Cultures Lesbiennes, 2009, 199 p. , pp. 13–14.

External links 
 Archives 
 Catalogue BNF
 IDREF
 VIAF

Defunct magazines published in Belgium
Women's magazines published in Belgium